Crowd control barriers (also referred to as crowd control barricades, with some versions called a French barrier or bike rack in the USA, and mills barriers in Hong Kong) are commonly used at many public events. They are frequently visible at sporting events, parades, political rallies, demonstrations, and outdoor festivals. Event organizers, venue managers, and security personnel use barricades as part of their crowd management planning.

History

Nadar
Brussels mayor Jules Anspach has been credited with the invention of the crowd control barrier for the occasion of the visit of the French photographer Nadar to Brussels. On his visit to Brussels with the balloon Géant, on September 26, 1864, Anspach erected mobile barriers to keep the crowd at a safe distance. Up to this day, crowd control barriers are known in both Belgian Dutch and Belgian French as Nadar barriers.

Interlocking steel barriers were patented in France in 1951.

See also
Chicane (barrier)
Crowd control
Temporary fencing
Vinyl fence
Privacy fencing
Crowd manipulation
2009 Birmingham Millennium Point stampede

Notes

External links

 Article about sawhorses used for crowd control
 Facility Manager article on steel barrier stability in windy conditions
 New York Daily News article on steel barrier use in New York City

Crowd control
Perimeter security
Street furniture